Vambola Helm (2 May 1934 Rakvere – 29 February 2020 Tallinn) was an Estonian motorcycle racer and coach.

1958-1973 he become 15-times Estonian champion in different motorsport disciplines.

In 1971 he was named to Estonian Athlete of the Year.

Students: Rene Aas, Meelis Helm and Vahur Helm.

References

1934 births
2020 deaths
Estonian motorcycle racers
Estonian sports coaches
Sportspeople from Rakvere
20th-century Estonian people